The Familia do Norte (English: Northern Family) is a criminal faction that occupies northern Brazil and some regions in other countries such as: Colombia, Peru and Venezuela. It is considered the 3rd largest faction in Brazil, and the largest in the state of Amazonas, in addition to not having good relations with other Brazilian factions, having already entered into several faction wars.

The group was created in 2007 by Fernandes Barbosa, Zé Roberto da Compensa and Gelson Carnaúba (known as Mano G.), it emerged in prisons and outskirts of Manaus, as a way of fighting to prevent the precarious and dangerous conditions that affected prisoners in Manaus. Between 2015 and 2018, the Familia do Norte and the Comando Vermelho formed an alliance to prevent the advance of the Primeiro Comando da Capital in Amazonas, generating the War between the PCC and CV in 2016. In 2018, the alliance dissolved, generating a confrontation between the Comando Vermelho and Familia do Norte, weakening the faction. The Familia do Norte also has its football team: Compensão, in which it has already invested 320 thousand reais (55 thousand dollars).

References 

Terrorism in Brazil
2007 establishments in Brazil
Organized crime groups in Brazil
Organized crime groups in Venezuela
Organized crime groups in Peru
Prison gangs